Dezadeash Lake is a lake of Yukon, Canada. It borders Kluane National Park, and lies along the edge of the Saint Elias Mountains.

A World War II military camp was based by the lake, at kilometre 202 (mile 125) of the Haines Highway, during the construction of the Haines and Alaska  highways. This camp was later converted into a lodge named Dezadeash Lodge in the 1960s. The lodge passed through various owners including Merle Lien, the father of recording artist Matthew Lien.

See also
List of lakes in Yukon

References
 National Resources Canada

Lakes of Yukon